Honorio Rafael Machado Pérez (born July 26, 1982 in Quíbor, Lara) is a Venezuelan former professional racing cyclist.

Major results

2002
 3rd  Points race, Central American and Caribbean Games
2003
 1st Stage 7a Vuelta a Venezuela
2004
 1st Stage 4 Vuelta al Táchira
 10th Road race, Pan American Under-23 Road Championships
2005
 1st Stage 5b Vuelta a Sucre
 1st Stage 3 Vuelta al Estado Zulia
 2nd Circuito del Porto
 10th GP Citta di Felino
2007
 1st Juegos Nacionales Venezuela
 3rd Paris–Brussels
2008
 Vuelta a Venezuela
1st Stages 11 & 14
 7th Giro di Toscana
 8th Gran Premio Città di Misano – Adriatico
2009
 1st  Road race, National Road Championships
 1st Clasico FVCiclismo Corre Por la VIDA
 Vuelta a Venezuela
1st Stages 6 & 10
 1st Stage 2 Vuelta a Lara
 3rd Clasico Aniversario Federacion Ciclista de Venezuela
2010
 1st  Road race, Central American and Caribbean Games
2011
 Vuelta a Venezuela
1st Stages 1 & 5
 1st Stage 4 Vuelta al Táchira
 2nd Copa Federación Venezolana de Ciclismo Por la Vida
 2nd Clásico Aniversario de la Federación Venezolana de Ciclismo
2013
 1st Stage 1 Ruta del Centro
2014
 7th Overall Volta do Paraná
1st Stages 1 & 4
2015
 1st Copa Federación Venezolana de Ciclismo
 1st  Points classification Vuelta a Guatemala

External links

1982 births
Living people
People from Lara (state)
Venezuelan male cyclists
Cyclists at the 2011 Pan American Games
Vuelta a Venezuela stage winners
Central American and Caribbean Games bronze medalists for Venezuela
Competitors at the 2002 Central American and Caribbean Games
Central American and Caribbean Games medalists in cycling
Pan American Games competitors for Venezuela
20th-century Venezuelan people
21st-century Venezuelan people
Competitors at the 2010 Central American and Caribbean Games